Mousa Al-Shammeri (born 15 May 1986) is a retired Saudi Arabian football player who played as a striker.

Honours
Al-Orobah
Saudi Second Division: 2007–08

References

External links
 

Living people
1986 births
People from Al-Jawf Province
Association football forwards
Saudi Arabian footballers
Al-Orobah FC players
Al-Raed FC players
Al-Faisaly FC players
Najran SC players
Al-Shabab FC (Riyadh) players
Al-Taawoun FC players
Saudi First Division League players
Saudi Professional League players
Saudi Second Division players